Star Wreck is a text adventure game written in 1987 by Charles A. Sharp. It was published by Alternative Software for the Spectrum 48k, Amstrad CPC, and Commodore 64. The game takes place in a parody of the Star Trek universe and the player takes on the role of Captain James T. Cake of the USS Paralysed.

Development
Star Wreck was written using the Graphic Adventure Creator. After its initial publication in 1987, it also appeared in Alternative Software's compilation tape 4-Most Adventures, in 1991.

Reception
Star Wreck was reviewed by Your Sinclair in December 1987, receiving 6 out of 10. Whilst enjoyable, the reviewer felt that the initial area (the Starship Paralysed) was too open, causing difficulties in working out what's going on.

References

External links 
 

1980s interactive fiction
1987 video games
Alternative Software games
Amstrad CPC games
Commodore 64 games
Parodies of Star Trek
Parody video games
Single-player video games
Video games developed in the United Kingdom
Video games set in outer space
ZX Spectrum games